Ajay Sancheti (born 22 October 1965)  is Member of Rajya Sabha belongs to Bharatiya Janata Party. He is a Member of Parliament, representing Maharashtra in the Rajya Sabha the upper house of Indian Parliament.

Early life
Sancheti was born to Vijaya Sancheti and Shaktikumar Sancheti.

Family and personal life
Ajay Sancheti married Savita on 15 February 1989. They have two sons.
Shri. Ajay Shaktikumar Sancheti - Non Executive Vice Chairman
A Commerce Graduate. He started his career in 1985 with a Coal Mine Construction Project. He has excellent managerial and interpersonal skills for business development. Owing & opening of Indonesian Coal mine is a major breakthrough. He has extensively travelled worldwide and widely known for his public relations. Heading/representing many social & Professional Bodies

Legislative

 May 2012 onwards Member, Committee on Ministry of Urban Development
 Member of Constitution (One Hundred and Twenty Second Amendment) Bill 2014, Since 12 May 2015
 Member Payment and Settlement Systems (Amendment) Bill 2014, Since 23 December 2014
 Member of Finance Committee since 1 September 2015

References

External links
Ajay Sancheti Rajya Sabha Profile 

1965 births
Living people
Rajya Sabha members from Maharashtra
Businesspeople from Nagpur
Bharatiya Janata Party politicians from Maharashtra
Politicians from Nagpur